Geomitra tiarella is a species of air-breathing land snail, terrestrial pulmonate gastropod mollusks in the family Geomitridae.

This species is endemic to Madeira, Portugal.

References

Endemic fauna of Madeira
Molluscs of Madeira
Geomitra
Gastropods described in 1833
Taxonomy articles created by Polbot